You, Me and the Big C is a British podcast about life with, treatment of and other topics relating to the disease cancer. The podcast was originally hosted by three former or current cancer patients; Deborah James, Lauren Mahon and Rachael Bland. Since Bland's death from cancer in September 2018, the podcast had also been occasionally co-hosted by her widower Steve Bland. James died from cancer in June 2022, leaving Mahon as the only surviving original host.

In January 2023, it was announced that Bland and Mahon would be leaving the podcast but stated that they wanted the podcast to continue.

Contents 
The podcast is designed to have a light-hearted feel to it. Former presenter Rachael Bland stated in an interview with The Guardian newspaper: "We wanted to create a space where you feel like you're sitting down with girls like you, having a cup of tea, talking about it like it's EastEnders."

Reception 
The podcast reached number one in the UK podcast charts on 4 September 2018, after Bland announced that she only had days to live.

In September 2018, it won Best Podcast at the Northern Blog Awards.

In October 2018, the podcast was awarded Best New Show at the Audio and Radio Industry Awards.

In March 2019, the podcast won Podcast of the Year at the TRIC (Television and Radio Industries Club) awards.

References

External links
 

Audio podcasts
2018 podcast debuts
Works about cancer
British podcasts
2018 establishments in the United Kingdom